This is a list of awards and nominations Hilary Duff has received during her career.

Billboard Music Awards
{| class="wikitable sortable"
|-
! scope="col" style="width:1em;"| Year
! scope="col" style="width:39em;"| Nominated work
! scope="col" style="width:36em;"| Category
! scope="col" style="width:5em;"| Result
! scope="col" style="width:2em;" class="unsortable"| 
|-
| rowspan=3|2003
| "So Yesterday"
| Top Hot 100 Single Sales
|rowspan=4 
|rowspan=3|
|-
| Lizzie McGuire
|  rowspan=2|Top Soundtrack
|-
| The Lizzie McGuire Movie
|-
| 2007
| Herself
| Top Hot Dance Club Play Artist
|

Bogart Children's Choice Awards

Bravo Otto

Channel V Thailand Music Video Awards

Disney Channel Kids Awards

DVD Exclusive Awards

Fort Myers Beach Film Festival Award

Golden Raspberry Awards

Juno Awards

People's Choice Awards

MTV Awards

MTV Video Music Awards

Los Premios MTV Latinoamérica

MTV TRL Awards (USA)

MTV Europe Music Awards

MTV TRL Awards (Italy)

TMF Holand Awards

Much Love Animal Benefit Awards

MuchMusic Video Awards

Nickelodeon Awards

Kids' Choice Awards

Australian Kids' Choice Awards

Nickelodeon Italy Awards

UK's Kids' Choice Awards

Radio Disney Music Awards

Teen Choice Awards

VH1 Awards

Young Artist Awards

World Music Awards

Other Awards/Nominations

AOL Awards

Basenotes Awards

Blender Magazine Awards

Cosmopolitan Magazine Awards

Seventeen Magazine Awards

Sugar Magazine Awards

Portrait Magazine Awards

MuchMusic Viewer's Poll

Rolling Stone Music Award

US Weekly Hot Young Hollywood Awards

Us Weekly Style Awards

StyleBistro Awards

Shortlists

Askmen Top 99 Women

Billboard Magazine

MuchMusic

People Magazine

Portrait Magazine Top Celebs Under 30

Rolling Stone

Teen People 25 Hottest Stars Under 25

Zimbio

FHM & Maxim's Magazine Rankings

Notes
  Shared with Chad Michael Murray.
  Shared with Lalaine, Jake Thomas, Adam Lamberg and Ashlie Brillault
  Shared with Lalaine, Jake Thomas and Adam Lamberg.
  Shared with Brent Kinsman, Shane Kinsman, Forrest Landis, Steven Anthony Lawrence, Liliana Mumy, Kevin Schmidt, Jacob Smith, Alyson Stoner, Blake Woodruff and Morgan York.

References

Lists of awards received by American actor
Duff, Hilary
Awards